Glory by Honor VIII: The Final Countdown was the 8th Glory By Honor professional wrestling event promoted by Ring of Honor. It took place on September 26, 2009, at the Manhattan Center in New York, New York. The show was headlined by Bryan Danielson vs. Nigel McGuinness, who were both making their last appearances for ROH before leaving for World Wrestling Entertainment. Danielson would go on to find success in the WWE, however McGuinness' contract had fallen through and he signed with Total Nonstop Action Wrestling. Danielson, who was the first to announce he was signing with WWE, was originally scheduled to face Austin Aries for the ROH World Championship, but the match was later changed when McGuinness also announced he was signing.

The second main event of the show featured Kevin Steen and El Generico ending their feud with the ROH World Tag Team Champions The American Wolves (Davey Richards & Eddie Edwards) in Ladder War II. There was uncertainty as to whether or not the match would even take place, as Edwards broke his elbow the night before in an "Anything Goes" match against Steen. Despite the injury, Edwards decided to compete in the match.

Results

References

External links
Official Glory By Honor IX website
Ring of Honor's official website

2009 in professional wrestling
Events in New York City
2009 in New York City
8
Professional wrestling in New York City